The 2006 Kansas gubernatorial election took place on November 7, 2006. Incumbent Democratic Governor Kathleen Sebelius, who sported high approval ratings ran for re-election to serve a second and final term. Governor Sebelius was unopposed for the Democratic nomination and she faced the Republican nominee, State Senator Jim Barnett, who emerged from a crowded primary. Sebelius soundly defeated Barnett and cruised to re-election, which was quite a considerable feat for a Democrat in staunchly conservative Kansas. , this remains the last time that a Democrat has carried more than nine counties or won a majority of the vote in a Kansas gubernatorial election.

Democratic primary

Candidates
Kathleen Sebelius, incumbent Governor of Kansas

Results

Republican primary

Candidates
Jim Barnett, State Senator
Running mate: Susan Wagle, state senator (2001–present) and former state representative (1991-2001)
Ken R. Canfield, author and founder of the National Center for Fathering
Running mate: Kathe Decker, state representative (1993–present)
Rex Crowell, former State Representative
Running mate: Brian Shepherd
Dennis Hawver, Libertarian nominee for Governor in 2002
Running mate: Bret D. Landrith, attorney
Robin Jennison, former Speaker of the Kansas House of Representatives
Running mate: Dennis Wilson, state senator (2005–present) and former state representative (1995-1999)
Timothy V. Pickell, attorney
Running mate: Jeffrey McCalmon
Richard "Rode" Rodewald, perennial candidate
Running mate: Helen Kanzig

General election

Predictions

Polling

Results

See also
 U.S. gubernatorial elections, 2006
 List of governors of Kansas

External links
Official campaign websites (Archived)
Kathleen Sebelius
Jim Barnett

References

Governor
2006
Kansas